San Carlos Municipality is a municipality located in the Mexican state of Tamaulipas.

External links 
 Gobierno Municipal de San Carlos Official website

Municipalities of Tamaulipas